Happy Air, legally Happy Air Travellers Co.,Ltd., was a small airline based in Thailand, offering scheduled domestic passenger flights out of Suvarnabhumi Airport, Bangkok, as well as charter services. It was founded on 3 April 2009 and ceased operations in February 2015.

Destinations
Happy Air offered scheduled flights from Bangkok to Chumphon and Ranong as well as charter services.

Fleet
Happy Air operated at least two Saab 340 with an age of 17 years.

References

Defunct airlines of Thailand
Airlines established in 2009
Airlines disestablished in 2015
2015 disestablishments in Thailand
Thai companies established in 2009